The Djiboutian Coast Guard ( GCD), is the coast guard of Djibouti is a division of the Djiboutian Navy responsible for protecting the interests of the Republic of Djibouti at sea. Formed in 2011, the coast guard is tasked with such as illegal fishing and exploitation of natural resources, search and rescue (SAR), protection of ecology, fishing, marine pollution, ballast waters, combat against terrorism, trafficking of people, narcotics, and similar. Like many other coast guards, it is a paramilitary organization that can support the Djiboutian Navy in wartime, but resides under separate civilian control in times of peace. The Coast Guard monitor vessels sailing in the Djiboutian territorial waters. The Djiboutian Coast Guard intercepted refugee and migrant boats travelling across the Bab-el-Mandeb.

Naval Equipment

Its small fleet includes half a dozen Zodiac and Avon type fast launches

See also 
 Djiboutian Navy
 Djiboutian Army
 Djiboutian Air Force

References 

Military of Djibouti